André Parmentier (29 May 1876 – 17 September 1939) was a French sport shooter who competed at the 1908 Summer Olympics and at the 1920 Summer Olympics. He was born in Sauveterre de Guyenne, Gironde. In 1908 he was a member of the French team which won the bronze medal in the team free rifle competition. He also finished fourth with the French team in the team military rifle event. In the 1908 Summer Olympics he also participated in the following events:

 300 metre free rifle - eighth place
 moving target small-bore rifle - tenth place
 disappearing target small-bore rifle - 21st place

Twelve years later he won the silver medal as member of the French team in the team 300 metre military rifle, prone competition. In the 1920 Summer Olympics he also participated in the following events:

 Team 300 and 600 metre military rifle, prone - fourth place
 Team 50 metre small-bore rifle - fifth place
 Team 300 metre military rifle, standing - fifth place
 Team 600 metre military rifle, prone - fifth place
 Team free rifle - seventh place
 300 metre free rifle, three positions - place unknown
 50 metre small-bore rifle - result unknown

References

External links
André Parmentier's profile at databaseOlympics

1876 births
1939 deaths
French male sport shooters
ISSF rifle shooters
Olympic shooters of France
Shooters at the 1908 Summer Olympics
Shooters at the 1920 Summer Olympics
Olympic silver medalists for France
Olympic bronze medalists for France
Olympic medalists in shooting
Medalists at the 1908 Summer Olympics
Medalists at the 1920 Summer Olympics